Arhopala antimuta or small tailess oakblue is a butterfly in the family Lycaenidae. It was described by Cajetan Felder and Rudolf Felder in 1865. It is found in the Indomalayan realm.

Subspecies
A. a. antimuta Burma, Mergui, Thailand, Langkawi, Peninsular Malaya, Singapore, Sumatra, Nias, Natuna
A. a. timana Corbet, 1941  Borneo, Bangka

References

External links

Arhopala Boisduval, 1832 at Markku Savela's Lepidoptera and Some Other Life Forms. Retrieved June 3, 2017.

Arhopala
Butterflies described in 1865